USS Bougainville may refer to:

  is a planned  expected to deliver in 2024

United States Navy ship names